Diane Lamarre, C.M., M.Sc., D.h.c. is a Canadian pharmacist and politician, who was elected to the National Assembly of Quebec in the 2014 election. She represented the electoral district of Taillon as a member of the Parti Québécois until her defeat in the 2018 election.

Prior to her election to the legislature, Lamarre was the president of the Ordre des pharmaciens du Québec.

She currently appears as a medical contributor on TVA Nouvelles.

References

Canadian pharmacists
Parti Québécois MNAs
Women MNAs in Quebec
Living people
French Quebecers
People from Montérégie
Members of the Order of Canada
21st-century Canadian politicians
21st-century Canadian women politicians
Year of birth missing (living people)
Quebecor people